Mohamed Fakhry Rifaat Abbas (born 25 November 1932) is an Egyptian diver. He competed in the men's 10 metre platform at the 1952 Summer Olympics.

References

1932 births
Living people
Divers at the 1952 Summer Olympics
Egyptian male divers
Olympic divers of Egypt
20th-century Egyptian people